Neobarynotus microlepis is a species of cyprinid fish found is Southeast Asia.  It is the only member of its genus.

References
 

Barbinae
Monotypic fish genera
Fish of Asia
Freshwater fish of Indonesia
Freshwater fish of Malaysia
Fauna of Brunei
Taxa named by Petre Mihai Bănărescu
Freshwater fish of Borneo